Valentin Osafovich Litovsky (1921, Moscow – 1941, Minsk) was a  Soviet actor, starred in the film Young Pushkin. Son of  writer  .

Biography 
He studied at the Moscow school No. 167, later No. 1113.

The actor, who starred in a role —  young Alexander Pushkin in  movie Young Pushkin, staged by director   at the studio Lenfilm in 1936, the centenary of the poet's death.

Valentin wanted to enter the GITIS to become a director, but these plans were interrupted by the war. October 23, 1939 was called Sverdlovsk RVC (Moscow Oblast, Moscow, Sverdlovsk District). In July (according to other sources — in October) 1941, it cuts short the life of the actor in the theater of military operations of World War II, near Minsk.

References

External links
 
 Валентин Литовский on KinoPoisk

1921 births
1941 deaths
Soviet male child actors
Male actors from Moscow
Soviet military personnel killed in World War II
Date of birth missing